Nick Malgieri is an American pastry chef and author.

His book Dough: Simple Contemporary Bread by Nick Malgieri was the recipient of the 2006 James Beard award in the Baking and Desserts category.

He was the first chef to teach a workshop at the James Beard Foundation headquarters.

He is a former teacher at the Institute of Culinary Education.

Early life and education
Malgieri went to Seton Hall University and the Culinary Institute of America.

Books
Nick Malgieri's Bread
How to Bake: The Complete Guide to Perfect Cakes, Cookies, Pies, Tarts, Breads, Pizzas, Muffins, Sweet and Savory (revised 2018)
Nick Malgieri's Pastry
BAKE!: Essential Techniques for Perfect Baking
The Modern Baker: Time-Saving Techniques for Breads, Tarts, Pies, Cakes and Cookies
Perfect Light Desserts
A Baker's Tour: Nick Malgieri's Favorite Baking Recipes from Around the World
Perfect Cakes
Cookies Unlimited
Nick Malgieri's Perfect Pastry: Create Fantastic Desserts by Mastering the Basic Techniques
Chocolate: From Simple Cookies to Extravagant Showstoppers
How to Bake: The Complete Guide to Perfect Cakes, Cookies, Pies, Tarts, Breads, Pizzas, Muffins, Sweet and Savory
Great Italian Desserts

References

External links
 https://www.nickmalgieri.com/

 

Year of birth missing (living people)
Living people